Lodi is an extinct town in Nye County, in the U.S. state of Nevada. The GNIS classifies it as a populated place.

History
The nearby Lodi mining district was established in 1874 with primary production occurring from 1920 until 1925.

A post office was established at Lodi in 1909, and closed in 1910. A variant name is "Lodival".

References

Ghost towns in Nye County, Nevada